Middlefork may refer to:

Middlefork, Clinton County, Indiana
Middlefork, Jefferson County, Indiana
Middlefork Township, Vermilion County, Illinois
Middlefork Methodist Episcopal Church

See also
Middle Fork (disambiguation)